Dr. Frost is a South Korean television series based on Lee Jong-beom's webtoon of the same name that was first serialized on web portal Naver in 2011. Starring Song Chang-eui in the title role, it aired on OCN from November 23, 2014, to February 1, 2015, on Sundays at 23:00 for 10 episodes.

Plot
Baek Nam-bong is a handsome, thirty-four year old professor of psychology by day and bartender by night, and he is nicknamed "Dr. Frost" because of his prematurely white hair. He sustained a frontal lobe injury in his childhood, which heightened his reasoning centers to genius-level, but left him unable to feel empathy, love, sorrow and other emotional responses.

Nam-bong also volunteers at the university's counseling center, where he meets the cheerful and meddlesome Yoon Sung-ah, who's on the fast track to graduate early and becomes his teaching assistant. Nam-bong has a love-hate relationship with his colleague Song Sun, a professor with a cold personality who was also his classmate in university. His mentor is Chun Sang-won, the head of the department of psychology. Given his excellent deductive skills, Nam-bong officially (and unofficially) assists veteran detective Nam Tae-bong in solving crime.

Cast
Song Chang-eui as Baek Nam-bong 
Jung Eun-chae as Yoon Sung-ah
Lee Yoon-ji as Song Sun
Sung Ji-ru as Nam Tae-bong
Choi Jung-woo as Chun Sang-won
Lee Hee-jin as Yoo Anna/Sung-hye
Yoon Jong-hoon as Kang Jin-wook
Im Kang-sung as Kim Jung-hoon
Kim Ga-young as Da-rae
Yeo Ui-joo as Young-ho
Yoo Gun as Bae Doo-han
Kim Pub-lae as Park Do-chul
Lee Si-won as Song Sul (Song Sun's younger sister)
Song Jong-ho as Moon Sung-hyun
Choi Soo-han as young Moon Sung-hyun
Seo Yi-an as Park In-young
Cha Joo-young as Lee Ji-hye
Park Sun-cheon as Orphanage director
Joo Ho-min
Ha Il-kwon
Lee Jong-beom
Seok Woo
Choi Woo-shik as Kim Jung-hoon

Ratings
In the table below, the blue numbers represent the lowest ratings and the red numbers represent the highest ratings.

References

External links
Dr. Frost official OCN website 

Dr. Frost webtoon at Naver 

OCN television dramas
2014 South Korean television series debuts
2015 South Korean television series endings
Television shows based on South Korean webtoons
South Korean crime television series
South Korean thriller television series